1948 Országos Bajnokság I (men's water polo) was the 42nd water polo championship in Hungary. Ten teams played one-round match for the title.

Final list 

* M: Matches W: Win D: Drawn L: Lost G+: Goals earned G-: Goals got P: Point

2. Class 
1. Csepeli MTK 20, 2. Előre 19 (1), 3. MTE 18, 4. Neményi 15, 5. BEAC 14 (2), III. ker. TVE 10 (1), BRE 9, TASE 9, Postás 4 (1), MÁVAG 4 (1), VAC 2 (1), Tipográfia 0 point. In parentheses number of matches is missed.

Sources 
Gyarmati Dezső: Aranykor (Hérodotosz Könyvkiadó és Értékesítő Bt., Budapest, 2002.)

1948 in water polo
1948 in Hungarian sport
Seasons in Hungarian water polo competitions